Ponchavadi (Panchvadi) is a village in the Ponda taluka (sub-district) of Goa.

Area, population

It is part of the Siroda Assembly constituency and is located at the extreme southern end of the Ponda taluka.

References

Villages in North Goa district